Signe Dagmar Charlotta Johansson-Engdahl (27 May 1905 – 9 May 2010) was a Swedish diver. She competed at the 1924 Summer Olympics in the 3 m springboard and placed fifth. From the death of Erna Sondheim on 9 January 2008 until her own death, she was believed to be the oldest living person to have competed in the Olympic games. She was married to the Olympic runner Nils Engdahl, and her sister-in-law Märta Johansson was also an Olympic diver.

References

1905 births
2010 deaths
Olympic divers of Sweden
Swedish centenarians
Swedish female divers
Divers at the 1924 Summer Olympics
Divers from Stockholm
Stockholms KK divers
Women centenarians
20th-century Swedish women
21st-century Swedish women